Lucio Silla, K. 135, is an Italian opera seria in three acts composed by Wolfgang Amadeus Mozart at the age of 16. The libretto was written by Giovanni de Gamerra, revised by Pietro Metastasio.

It was first performed on 26 December 1772 at the Teatro Regio Ducale in Milan and was regarded as "a moderate success".

Handel's opera Silla (1713) covered the same subject. Other operas with the same title were also composed by Leonardo Vinci (1723), Pasquale Anfossi (1774), and Johann Christian Bach (1776).

Performance history

Lucio Silla premiered on 26 December 1772 in Milan at the Teatro Regio Ducale. Its UK premiere was produced by Camden Town Hall in London in 1967. Its US premiere followed in 1968 with a performance in Baltimore.

Among other performances, Lucio Silla was given by the Santa Fe Opera in 2005 and in Warsaw in 2011 and by The Classical Opera Company in London in 2012. In 2013 the Gran Teatre del Liceu produced the opera in Barcelona and it was performed at both the Mozartwoche Salzburg and Salzburg Festival Lucio Silla was staged at Madrid's Teatro Real in 2017 as part of the program for its bicentennial celebration. In November 2017, La Monnaie in Belgium produced and performed the opera in a contemporary setting.

Roles

Synopsis
The story concerns the Roman dictator Lucio Silla (Lucius Sulla) who lusts after Giunia, the daughter of his enemy Gaius Marius. Giunia, on the other hand, loves the exiled senator Cecilio.

Act 1
Scene 1: A secluded spot on the banks of the TiberThe exiled Senator Cecilio meets his friend Cinna who tells him his betrothed Giunia mourns his death, a lie by the dictator Silla so that he can win her for himself. Cinna advises Cecilio to meet Giunia by the tomb of her father (murdered hero Gaius Marius). Cecilio is filled with joy at the idea and Cinna shares his joy and predicts the freedom of Rome (aria: "Vieni ov' amor t' inita").

Scene 2

Cecilio excited at the prospect of meeting his betrothed sings of his love (aria: "Il tenero momento").

Scene 3: Giunia's apartments

Silla seeks the advice of his sister Celia on his approach with Giunia and she advises subtlety and kindness (aria: "Se lusinghiera speme").

Scene 4

On Silla's approach, Giunia declares her love for Cecilio and her hate for Silla, her father's enemy (aria: "Dalla sponda tenebrosa").

Scene 5

Alone, Silla, insulted, decides to behave as a tyrant (aria: "Il desìo di vendetta, e di morte").

Scene 6

Cecilio waits by the tomb for Giunia.

Scene 7

Giunia arrives (chorus and ariosa: "Fuor di queste urne dolente").

Act 2
An archway decorated with military trophies

Silla is joined by Celia to whom he tells of his plans to wed Giunia and for Celia to wed her beloved Cinna on this day.

Scene 3

Cinna restrains Cecilio who has his sword drawn trying to follow Silla, believing he has been instructed by the spirit of Gaius Marius to seek revenge. Cinna tells him to consider Giunia and his rage is controlled (aria: "Quest' improvviso trèmito").

Scene 4[??]

Giunia consults with Cinna who suggests she accept Silla's proposal and then murder him in their wedding bed. Giunia refuses, stating that vengeance is for Heaven alone to consider. She asks Cinna to make sure that Cecilio stays hidden from danger (aria: "Ah se il crudel periglio").

Scene 5

Cinna resolves to kill Silla himself (aria: "Nel fortunato istante").

Scene 6, Hanging gardens

Silla's love for Giunia starts to bring out his compassion.

Scene 7

Giunia's hateful face angers him again and he threatens her with death but not to die alone (aria: "D' ogni pieta mi spoglio").

Scene 8

With Cecilio, Giunia worries about Silla's words and they part.

Scene 9

Celia asks Giunia to accept Silla's proposal for the sake of happiness saying she is also to be married to Cinna (aria: "Quando sugl' arsi campi").

Scene 10

Giunia ponders her wretchedness.

Scene 11, the Capitol

Silla asks the Senate and the people of Rome to reward him as a hero of Rome with the marriage to Giunia.

Scene 12

When Cecilio appears, there is confrontation (trio: "Quell' orgoglioso sdegno").

Act 3
Scene 1: Entrance to the dungeons

Cecilio has been imprisoned. Cinna and Celia has gained access and Cinna asks Celia to convince Cecilio to repent and forget his love. Cinna promises to marry Celia if she is successful, for which she is hopeful (aria: "Strider sento la procella").

Scene 2

Whilst Cecilio accepts his fate Cinna tells him not to worry, Silla's heart over his head will bring about his own downfall (aria: "De' più superbi il core").

Scene 3

Silla has allowed Giunia one last visit to Cecilio and they say their farewells (aria: "Pupille amate").

Scene 4

Giunia alone with her thoughts of Cecilio's impending death thinks of her own (aria: "Frà I pensier più funesti di morte").

Scene 5: The audience chamber

Before the Senators and the people of Rome, to everybody's surprise, Silla declares that he wishes Cecilio to live and marry Giunia. When questioned on his silence, Cinna declares his hatred of Silla and his intention of killing him. Silla issues his "punishment" to Cinna that he should marry his beloved Celia. He further declares that he will step down as dictator and restore liberty to Rome. He explains that he has seen proof that innocence and a virtuous heart is triumphant over power and glory. The people of Rome celebrate liberty and the greatness of Silla.

Noted ariasAct 1 "Dalla sponda tenebrosa" – Giunia
 "Il desio di vendetta" – Silla
 "Il tenero momento" – Cecilio
 "Se lusinghiera speme" – Celia
 "Vieni ov'amor t'invita" – Lucio CinnaAct 2 "Guerrier che d'un acciaro" – Aufidio
 "Nel fortunato istante" – Lucio Cinna
 "Parto, m'affretto" – Giunia
 "Ah se a morir" – Cecilio
 "Ah se il crudel periglio" – Giunia
 "D'ogni pietà mi spoglio" – Silla
 "Quando sugl'arsi campi" – Celia
 "Quest' improvviso tremito" – Cecilio
 "Se il labbro timido" – CeliaAct 3 "De più superbi il core" – Lucio Cinna
 "Fra i pensier" – Giunia
 "Pupille amate" – Cecilio
 "Strider sento la procella" – Celia

Recordings
 1962: Carlo Felice Cillario with Fiorenza Cossotto, Dora Gatta, Rena Gary Falachi, Ferrando Ferrari, Luigi Pontiggia, Anna Maria Rota. Orchestra da camera dell'Angelicum di Milano. (Sarx Records, Cat:SXAM 2019-2)
 1985: Sylvain Cambreling with Anthony Rolfe Johnson, Lelia Cuberli, Anne Murray, Christine Barbaux, Arulan, van Baasbank, Chorus and Orchestra of the Théâtre Royal de la Monnaie, Brussels
 1991 (recorded January 1975): Leopold Hager with Arleen Auger, Helen Donath, Edith Mathis, Júlia Várady, Werner Krenn and Peter Schreier, Salzburg Mozarteum Orchestra (Originally issued on LP by Deutsche Grammophon; reissued on Philips 422 532–2 PME3, 3 CD; reissue for 1991 Philips' The Complete Mozart Edition vol. 32, with libretto; and 2000–2006 Philips Complete Compact Mozart Edition box 13 "Early Italian Operas", including five operas, without libretto, but with booklet). It lasts 211 minutes and is considered the complete reference recording.
 1991 (recorded June 1989 on period instruments): Nikolaus Harnoncourt with Peter Schreier, Edita Gruberová, Cecilia Bartoli, Dawn Upshaw and Yvonne Kenny, Concentus Musicus Wien (Teldec 2292-44928-2, 2 CD). Score is considerably cut, omits arias No. 8 (Aufidio), No. 10 (Celia), No. 14 (Cecilio), No. 16 (Giunia), and drops the marginal role of Aufidio. This version is about one hour shorter than the complete Philips/Hager recording.
2006/7: Tomáš Netopil with Roberto Saccà, Annick Massis, Monica Bacelli, Veronica Cangemi, Julia Kleiter, Stefano Ferrari, Chorus and Orchestra of Teatro La Fenice
 2008: Ádám Fischer with Simone Nold, Jakob Naeslund Madsen, Kristina Hammarström, Susanne Elmark, Henriette Bonde-Hansen, Danish Radio Sinfonietta, Lothar Odinius & Ars Nova

ReferencesNotesSources'

External links
 
 
 Libretto (in English translation)
 Libretto (Italian) – opera.stanford.edu
 , La Scala (the 2013 Salzburg production)

Operas by Wolfgang Amadeus Mozart
Italian-language operas
1772 operas
Operas set in ancient Rome
Operas based on real people
Cultural depictions of Sulla
Operas